U.S. Route 136 (US 136) is a part of the United States Numbered Highway that runs from Edison, Nebraska to Speedway, Indiana. In Indiana, it is part of the Indiana State Road system that enters between Danville, Illinois, and Foster, Indiana. The  of US 136 that lie within Indiana serve as a major conduit. Some sections of the highway is listed on the National Highway System. Various sections are rural two-lane highway and urbanized four-lane divided highways. The easternmost community along the highway is Speedway, near Indianapolis.

US 136 passes through farm fields and woodlands, and along the central part of Indiana. The highway was first designated as a US Highway in 1932. US 136 replaced the original State Road 33 designation of the highway which dated back to the formation of the Indiana state road system. SR 33 ran from the Illinois to Crawfordsville.  US 136 also replaced the second designation of the highway, State Road 34 from the Illinois state line to Crawfordsville to Brownsburg and ended in Indianapolis.

Route description
US 136 enters Indiana from Illinois heading due east, before turning northeast. The highway turns back due east and has an interchange at State Road 63 (SR 63).  East of SR 63 the road passes over the Wabash River and enters Covington. While in Covington the route turns south passing through residential properties, as a two-lane highway. Before leaving Covington the highway turns southeasterly, passing through farmland. Between Covington and Veederburg the highway passes over Interstate 74 (I–74).  The road enters Veederburg and begins a short concurrency with US 41, heading due south. US 136 leaves US 41 turning due east, before turning southeasterly. The highway has a short concurrency with SR 25 in Waynetown. East of Waynetown the route heads toward Crawfordsville passing through farmland, with a few houses. The highway enters Crawfordsville from the northwest as a two-lane highway, passing through mainly residential.  The road curves due east having a traffic light at US 231. This traffic light is also the western end of the SR 32 and     SR 47 concurrences. The concurrency with both state roads end when US 136 turns southeasterly and the state roads keeping heading easterly. The highway heads southeasterly as a two-lane highway, passing through farmland with some woodlands mix in.  The route enters Brownsburg at a traffic light with SR 267. After Brownsburg the highway crosses the CSX Railroad tracks.  Before entering Marion County the route passes by the Lucas Oil Raceway. After the raceway the highway enters Marion County and the town of Clermont. When the route enters Marion the local name becomes Crawfordsville Road. The road leaves Clermont and enters Indianapolis, as a four-lane divided highway, passing through mainly commercial properties. The road enters the town of Speedway and has an interchange with I–74 and I–465. US 136 ends at this interchange and Crawfordsville Road continues in an east-southeasterly direction, as a city street. Crawfordsville Road ends at Sixteenth Street, near the Indianapolis Motor Speedway.

The only segment of US 136 that is included as a part of the National Highway System (NHS) is the segment concurrent with US 231.  The NHS is a network of highways that are identified as being most important for the economy, mobility and defense of the nation.  The highway is maintained by the Indiana Department of Transportation (INDOT) like all other U.S. Highways in the state. The department tracks the traffic volumes along all state highways as a part of its maintenance responsibilities using a metric called average annual daily traffic (AADT). This measurement is a calculation of the traffic level along a segment of roadway for any average day of the year. In 2010, INDOT figured that lowest traffic levels were the 1,200 vehicles and 60 commercial vehicles used the highway daily between New Ross and Jamestown. The peak traffic volumes were 21,350 vehicles and 1,090 commercial vehicles AADT along the section of US 136 at the eastern terminus of US 136.

History

In 1918, SR 33 was commission along what is now US 136, from Illinois state line to Crawfordsville.  The route was extended southeast to Indianapolis and the number changed to SR 34 on October 1, 1926 Also in that year the first section was paved, from Illinois state line to Veedersburg.  By 1928 the eastern part of the road from Crawfordsville to Indianapolis was paved, leaving only between Veedersburg and Crawfordsville unpaved.  In 1931, the highway was paved between Veedersburg and Crawfordsville. SR 34 was renumbered US 136 in 1950. U.S. 136 met its parent route, U.S. 36 at the intersection of Dr. Martin Luther King, Jr. and 16th Streets. The highway had the eastern terminus moved from downtown Indianapolis to Speedway in 1991, at an interchange with I–74 and I–465.

Major intersections

See also

U.S. Route 36
State Road 334

References

External links

 Indiana
36-1
Transportation in Vermillion County, Indiana
Transportation in Warren County, Indiana
Transportation in Fountain County, Indiana
Transportation in Montgomery County, Indiana
Transportation in Boone County, Indiana
Transportation in Hendricks County, Indiana
Transportation in Marion County, Indiana
Transportation in Indianapolis